Posterior labial may refer to:

 Posterior labial arteries
 Posterior labial nerves
 Posterior labial veins